929 West Grace Street has been a live music venue in the City of Richmond, Virginia since 1970. Over the years, it has operated under various names. Since the 1980s, it was the hub of Richmond's punk and hardcore scene, and is credited with helping Richmond bands Gwar, Lamb of God, Avail, and Four Walls Falling develop.

History
Before becoming a music venue, the building was home to R.L. Christian, a local grocery store known for manufacturing its own whisky. After the closing of Christian's, the building became a music venue known as 'The Back Door'. It was this incarnation that musician Bruce Springsteen played the club, with an early version of the E Street Band. In the 1980s, it became club called 'The Wooden Plate', and skewed towards heavy metal music. In the mid-1980s the club became known as 'Twisters', and saw performances from bands such as The Smashing Pumpkins and Green Day. In late 2002, the club became '929', then in 2003, 'Nanci Raygun'.

In 2009, the club became 'Strange Matter', and operated until closing in December 2018.

Notable performances
 Against Me
 Agent Orange
 Agnostic Front
 Alchemist's Lament
 Atmosphere
 Avail
 The Business
 Bruce Springsteen
 Cut The Architect's Hand
 Dinosaur Jr.
 Good Riddance
 Gwar
 Death Piggy
 Lagwagon
 Lamb of God
 My Chemical Romance
 Peelander Z
 Smashing Pumpkins
 White Cross
 Whatever Brains
 Mens Room
 Order
 High on Fire
 Truman Sparks
 Battlemaster
 Lightning Bolt

References

Music of Richmond, Virginia
History of Richmond, Virginia
1970 establishments in Virginia
2018 disestablishments in Virginia